Calum is a given name. It is a variation of the name Callum, which is a Scottish Gaelic name that commemorates the Latin name Columba, meaning "dove".

It may refer to:

Calum Angus (born 1986), English footballer
Calum Best (born 1981), British/American former fashion model turned celebrity
Calum Bett (born 1981), Icelandic football player
Calum Bowen (born 1991), Musician and video game producer
Calum Butcher (born 1991), English footballer
Calum Chambers (born 1995), English footballer
Calum Clark (born 1989), professional rugby union player
Calum Elliot (born 1987), Scottish professional footballer
Calum Ferguson (born 1995), Canadian soccer player
Calum Forrester, professional Scottish rugby player
Calum Giles (born 1972), former Great Britain olympic field hockey player
Calum Harvie, UK based music writer specialising in metal and extreme music
Calum Hood (born 1996), bassist and member of Australian pop rock band 5 Seconds of Summer
Calum Kennedy (1928–2006), Scottish singer
Calum Lewis (born 1996), former radio host at Fresh FM
Calum MacDonald (politician) (born 1956), Labour Member of Parliament for the Western Isles from 1987 to 2005
Calum MacKay (ice hockey) (1927–2001), former Canadian ice hockey player
Calum Maclean (folklorist) (1915–1960), Scottish folklorist, collector, ethnographer and author
Calum MacLeod (cricketer) (born 1988), Scottish professional cricketer
Calum MacLeod (of Raasay), crofter who built Calum's Road on the Island of Raasay, Scotland
Calum MacLeod (producer), the co-host, writer, creator and creative producer of the Canadian TV series Road Hockey Rumble
Calum MacRae (born 1980), Scottish rugby union player
Calum Malcolm, Scottish record producer, sound engineer and keyboardist
Calum Murray (born 1967), Scottish football referee
Calum O'Connell (born 1990), Australian footballer
Calum Reidford (born 1987), Scottish professional football goalkeeper
Calum Scott (born 1988), English singer and songwriter
Calum Stewart (born 1982), Scottish player of the uilleann pipes and Irish flute
Calum Willock (born 1981), English-born Saint Kittitian and Nevisian footballer
Calum Woods (born 1987), English footballer
Calum Worthy (born 1991), Canadian actor

See also
Callum, orthographic variant of the name

References

Scottish masculine given names
English-language masculine given names
Scottish Gaelic masculine given names